Joseph E. "Joe" Potter is an American sociologist, demographer, and professor of sociology at the University of Texas at Austin. Since 2011, he has also been the leader of the Texas Policy Evaluation Project (TxPEP), which has aimed to investigate the effect of restrictive abortion and family planning laws passed in Texas. Previously, he was the director of the Border Contraceptive Access Study. He received his Ph.D. in economics from Princeton University.

Work
As part of his work with TxPEP, Potter co-authored a 2016 study of the effects of Texas's funding cuts to Planned Parenthood on the number of births among Medicaid patients and the use of birth control in the state. He has also researched the demand for long-acting reversible contraception (e.g. IUDs) and female sterilization among Texas women, and the difference between the percent of women who want to use such contraceptives and the percent who actually use them.

References

External links

Living people
American sociologists
American demographers
University of Texas at Austin faculty
Princeton University alumni
Year of birth missing (living people)